Making the Cut is an American reality television series created and presented by Heidi Klum and Tim Gunn. The series premiered on March 27, 2020, on Amazon Prime Video. In March 2021, the series was renewed for a second season. The second season premiered on July 16, 2021. In April 2022, the series was renewed for a third season. The third season premiered on August 19, 2022.

Cast

Hosts
 Heidi Klum
 Tim Gunn

Judges

Season 1
 Naomi Campbell
 Nicole Richie
 Chiara Ferragni
 Carine Roitfeld
 Joseph Altuzarra

Season 2
 Jeremy Scott
 Winnie Harlow

Season 3
 Jeremy Scott
 Nicole Richie

Designers (Season 1)

Designers (Season 2)

Designers (Season 3)

Episodes

Season 1 (2020)

Season 2 (2021)

Season 3 (2022)

Designer progress

Season 1 (2020)

Season 2 (2021)

Season 3 (2022)

 The designer won Making The Cut.
 The designer won the challenge.
 The designer had some of the best looks for the challenge but did not win.
 The designer received feedback but was deemed safe.
 The designer was deemed safe and did not receive feedback.
 The designer was a sewing assistant/model for this challenge and was not up for elimination.
 The designer had some of the worst looks of the challenge but did not get eliminated.
 The designer was originally going to be eliminated, but one or more of the judges changed their minds.
 The designer was eliminated from the competition.

Production
On September 7, 2018, it was announced that Klum and Gunn would be leaving Project Runway to develop a fashion reality television series for Amazon Prime Video.

On June 26, 2019, it was announced that the series would be called Making the Cut and that Campbell, Richie, Roitfeld and Altuzarra would be judges on the show.

The series is executive produced by Klum, Gunn, Sara Rea, Page Feldman and Jennifer Love through SKR Productions.

On March 2, 2021, the series was renewed for a second season. The second season premiered on July 16, 2021.

On April 13, 2022, the series was renewed for a third season. The third season premiered on August 19, 2022.

References

External links
 Making the Cut on Amazon Prime Video
 

2020 American television series debuts
2020s American reality television series
Amazon Prime Video original programming
English-language television shows
Television series by Amazon Studios
Fashion-themed reality television series
Fashion design
Television shows filmed in New York City
Television shows filmed in France
Television shows filmed in Japan
Television shows filmed in California
Reality competition television series